Qeshlaq-e Chukhli Quyi may refer to:
Qeshlaq-e Chukhli Quyi Bahadruhamat
Qeshlaq-e Chukhli Quyi Hajj Akbar
Qeshlaq-e Chukhli Quyi Hajj Hasan Akhteri
Qeshlaq-e Chukhli Quyi Hajj Hasan Ali
Qeshlaq-e Chukhli Quyi Hajj Ramazan
Qeshlaq-e Chukhli Quyi Hoseyn Aq Bashlar
Qeshlaq-e Chukhli Quyi Khodash